Syntripsa flavichela is a species of freshwater crab found in Lake Towuti and Lake Mahalona on the Indonesian island of Sulawesi.

References

Further reading
Schubart, Christoph D., Tobias Santl, and Peter Koller. "Mitochondrial patterns of intra-and interspecific differentiation among endemic freshwater crabs of ancient lakes in Sulawesi." Contributions to Zoology 77.2 (2008): 83-90.
Schubart, Christoph D., and Peter KL Ng. "A new molluscivore crab from Lake Poso confirms multiple colonization of ancient lakes in Sulawesi by freshwater crabs (Decapoda: Brachyura)." Zoological Journal of the Linnean Society 154.2 (2008): 211-221.
Poettinger, Theodor, and Christoph D. Schubart. "Molecular diversity of freshwater crabs from Sulawesi and the sequential colonization of ancient lakes." Hydrobiologia 739.1 (2014): 73-84.

External links

WORMS

Decapods
Freshwater crustaceans of Asia
Crustaceans of Indonesia
Crustaceans described in 2006